Colonel Peter Morrison is a Magistrate of the Australian Capital Territory. He was appointed as a magistrate on 14 February 2012.

Career 
Morrison worked in Queensland as private lawyer for 26 years.

He was then a military judge and judge advocate in the Australian Defence Force. Notably, he was the judicial officer in the matter that ultimately saw the shortlived Australian Military Court ruled constitutionally invalid by the High Court.

Morrison was then appointed to the Magistrates Court of the Australian Capital Territory on 14 February 2012.

References 

Magistrates of the Magistrates Court of the Australian Capital Territory
Living people
Year of birth missing (living people)
Australian magistrates
21st-century Australian judges
20th-century Australian lawyers